Ciudad del Este (Spanish for Eastern City; often shortered as CDE) is the second-largest city in Paraguay and capital of the Alto Paraná Department, situated on the Paraná River. It is located 327 km from Asunción, the capital, and is adjacent to the border with Brazil, to which it is connected by the Friendship Bridge on the Paraná River. It is the largest city within the Triple Frontier region, which borders Foz do Iguaçu, Brazil and Puerto Iguazú, Argentina. The Itaipú Dam, one of the largest hydroelectric power plants in the world, is near Ciudad del Este, as is the Iguazu Falls.

Ciudad del Este is a commercial city, and is one of the largest free-trade zones in the world. Its tax-free status attracts many Brazilians and Argentines to the city.

Ciudad del Este has consulates for Argentina, Brazil, Mexico, Peru, Uruguay, Spain, France, Germany, Italy, Slovakia, Syria, Turkey, and Taiwan.

The city is home to Club Atlético 3 de Febrero, whose home ground Estadio Antonio Aranda was used for the 1999 Copa América and is Paraguay's third biggest football stadium. Ciudad del Este will host the 2022 South American Rugby Championship.

The city is the seat of the Roman Catholic Diocese of Ciudad del Este.

History 
After the fall of Argentine President Juan Domingo Perón in the 1950s, the government of Alfredo Stroessner took the decision to vigorously promote the so-called "March to the East", seeking to reach the Atlantic Ocean, through Brazil. The main problem encountered in the exit through the Río de la Plata was the excessively expensive freight, which made the exported products commercially uncompetitive. In 1955, the Mixed Paraguayan-Brazilian Commission was set up to boost the highway to the East, and in 1956 a reconnaissance flight was made on Alto Paraná. The construction of a road route to the Paraná River bank was led by Captain Porfirio Pereira Ruiz Díaz, who supervised several army units in the building of a 200-kilometre section from Coronel Oviedo.

On 3 February 1957, the city now known as Ciudad del Este was founded by decree, but with the name of "Puerto Flor de Lis" ("Port Lily Flower") close by a location known as Tacuru pucu ("Tall Termite Hill" in the Guarani) which was for a time the upper limit of navigation on the Paraná River.

Later, it was renamed "Puerto Presidente Stroessner" ("President Stroessner Port"), in honor of the dictator Alfredo Stroessner.

After the 1989 Paraguayan coup d'état, a referendum was held to decide on a new name, and Ciudad del Este ("East City") was chosen.

Settlement in the region was hampered by dense jungle, but the city and the local economy expanded rapidly after the construction of the Friendship Bridge and the Acaray and Itaipu dams during the 1960s and 1970s. The city has attracted many immigrants and now has sizeable Chinese, Arab, Indian, and Korean populations. It is the second most developed and populated city in the country.

Geography 
The city, coextensive with the homonymous district, is located in south-eastern Paraguay. Part of an international tripoint known as the "Triple Frontier", Ciudad del Este lies opposite the Brazilian city of Foz do Iguaçu (state of Paraná). Separated from it by Paraná River, it is linked by the Friendship Bridge. The Argentine border is located between the neighboring town of Presidente Franco and Puerto Iguazú (Misiones Province). Ciudad del Este, along with the towns and districts of Hernandarias, Minga Guazú, and Presidente Franco, forms a metropolitan area named Gran Ciudad del Este (Greater Ciudad del Este).

Ciudad del Este is on the international route that connects southeastern Bolivia (Santa Cruz) with southern Brazil. This has contributed to the city's development as a smuggling post between Paraguay and Brazil.

Hydrography 
The Paraná River borders the city to the east. The district is also surrounded by the Acaray River to the north, which separates it from Hernandarias District, while to the southwest it is surrounded by the Monday River that separates it from the municipality of Los Cedrales. In the city there are other streams, lakes, and bridges:
 Amambay Stream, on the Monday side, feeds the Republic Lake.
 Acaraymí Stream, on the Acaray side, connects with the Amambay stream underground.
 Saltito Stream, located in the southeast, serves as a boundary with the jurisdiction of Presidente Franco.
 The Republic Lake, is the recreational site par excellence in the city.
 The Yrendy Lake, located in the neighborhood Monday about 1,000 meters (1 km) from Route 7, was designated an ecological sanctuary for its beauty and natural wealth through a municipal resolution.
 The José Costa Cavalcanti bridge over the Acaray river, popularly known as "Puente Seco" (Dry Bridge), is a junction between Mariscal López Avenue and the Itaipú Superhighway which connects the Pablo Rojas neighborhood with the Paraná Country Club of Hernandarias.
 The Peru bridge, over the Acaray river, connects the Don Bosco neighborhood with the Itaipú neighborhood of Hernandarias.

Climate 
Ciudad del Este has a humid subtropical climate under Köppen's climate classification. The high humidity usually becomes suffocating in the heat.

In the winter of 1982, it snowed for the first time in the city, being the second snowfall registered in the country.

Economy 
Ciudad del Este is the second most important city in the country, after Asunción. It gathers 8% of Paraguayan gross domestic product, that is, about 3.5 billion dollars. Some 244 companies there operate in the Services Sector and in the Industrial Sector, among which stand out the manufacture of auto parts, the textile industry, maquilas, industries developer, and others. Since Ciudad del Este does not have rural areas, it does not have any measurable agro-livestock activity of its own, but it does serve as a regional nucleus for other adjacent urban centers which do have agro-livestock activity, such as Hernandarias, Presidente Franco and Minga Guazú. The city has a large food market with more than 800 shops selling fruits, vegetables, and clothing.

Ciudad del Este has repeatedly been on the list of notorious markets for infringing goods by the United States Trade Representative. The city is the headquarters of the company that operates the nearby Itaipu Dam.

The city's economy (along with Paraguay's economy) relies heavily on the mood of the Brazilian economy, as 95% of Paraguay's share of the energy generated by the Itaipu Dam is sold to Brazil (for US$300 million), and that every day many Brazilians cross the border to buy less expensive products (US$1.2 billion, mostly electronics).

Smuggling is a major occupation in the city, with some estimates putting the value of this black market at five times the national economy. It is reported that Lebanese immigrants with links to Hezbollah are operating money laundering activities and cocaine trafficking in the city.

In recent decades, Ciudad del Este has seen the development of a market in electronic and computer products, as well as consumer products, as well as luxury (perfumes, fine alcohols, and others). The economy of the city has diversified, led essentially by the installation of new industrial activities outside the traditional commercial focus, such as agribusiness, because in the city are located the largest agricultural companies in the country.

Tourism 
It has hotels, modern shopping centers, restaurants, casino and night entertainment centers. While shopping tourism is what most characterizes Ciudad del Este, in the area there are numerous tourist attractions of various kinds, as they constitute the most striking presentation letter of the central core in the region, like the internationally known as the Triple Frontier; there, Paraguay, Brazil and Argentina converge each other:
 20 km to the north, in Hernandarias is the Itaipú dam, one of the largest hydroelectric power plants in the world, and the Museum of the Guaraní Land;
 8 km to the south, in President Franco are the Jumps of Monday, fall of water of the river of the same name;
 26 km to the south is the Moisés Bertoni Scientific Monument, a protected area where is the house in which the wise man carried out his research and publications;
 20 km to the east, on the border between Argentina and Brazil, are the majestic Iguazu Falls.

Located near the center of the city, there is founded the "Lake of Republic" which is surrounded by vegetation which takes advantage of the waters from the Amambay stream and has a recreation area with an open-air amphitheater which offers the community a public place to enjoy artistic and cultural events. In its surroundings there are also walkways, bike paths, rest areas, playgrounds, gym, and gastronomic venues par excellence.

The 3D Planet Museum is a space located within the Paris Shopping. These are 3D paintings hand painted by international artists, among which the Great Wall of China, the Iguazu Falls, the Roman Colosseum, Venice, Africa and outer space stand out. It also has a labyrinth of mirrors among the multiple attractions exhibited in rooms divided into five different areas. The shopping center has also a snow park.

El Turista Róga (Tourist's home), is a dependency of the National Secretariat of Tourism (SENATUR), located in front of the Green Park, near the center of the city. This one is specialized in orientation and reception of tourists, also has a reception room and wide information suitable to deliver brochures and explanatory leaflets in languages such as English, French, Italian, German, Korean, Portuguese, and Spanish.

Demographics 
Ciudad del Este is the most populous city in the country after Asunción, with a population of 301,815 persons, including 152,393 men and 149,422 women, according to projections of the DGEEC for 2019.

It represents 36.8% of the departmental population (819,589) and 4.22% of the national population (7,152,703).

Ciudad del Este is a multicultural and diverse city. It is home to a large Asian-born population, specifically of Taiwanese, Korean, Lebanese and Iranian origin, evident in the city's mosques and pagodas. From the 1970s, Sunni Muslim Arabs moved to the city. This changed in the 1980s to Shia Muslim Arabs from South Lebanon.

As in the rest of the country, a large part of the population is bilingual in both, Spanish and Guaraní, in addition to Jopara, but the use of Portuguese is also common for thousands of people and is mainly used in the commercial and agricultural sector. Thanks to the strong presence of Asian and Middle Eastern immigrants, languages such as Arabic, Chinese, and Korean are commonly used in the downtown area of the city both in conversation and in posters.

Neighborhoods 
Ciudad del Este is organized territorially in 30 neighborhoods. Route No. 7 "Dr. Gaspar Rodríguez de Francia" divides the city into two parts: 9 neighborhoods in the north and 21 neighborhoods in the south. The Microcentro neighborhood is the only one located in the middle of Route 7, extending minimally on the north side.

Urban landscape

Architecture 
Although it is a relatively new city, it is not exempt from having buildings of classical architecture, which can be seen at the Plaza Jesuítica.

Green areas 
Ciudad del Este has diverse spaces with densely populated arboreal areas. Among the main parks include the Ex-airport Alejo García park, the Monseñor Agustín Van Aaken park, the Bernardino Caballero park, the Acosta Ñu park, the Green Park and a score of other places. Emblematic and popular sites such as the Alejo García park (Ex-airport) and Monseñor Agustín Van Aaken park offer different recreation areas such as bicycle paths, aerobic stations, skateboarding tracks, and other recreational games.

Along the Los Yerbales Avenue, parks like "Manuel Ortiz Guerrero", "José Asunción Flores", "Salto del Guairá", and "Guayaivi" are all natural spaces whose main function is to conserve regional biodiversity. On the other hand, the Linear Park is a project financed by Itaipú Binacional and is focused on the use of the first three parks mentioned above; This project is based on the remodeling of green spaces for citizens' free access. The Linear Park, of about 50 hectares, is equipped with sanitary sewer systems, water network, video surveillance system, trails, cycle paths, free access to WIFI networks, playgrounds, outdoor gym, senior area, sector for food truck and a new effluent drainage system.

Urban development plan 
Given the rapid growth of the metropolitan region, plans are being projected for the development, reconversion and urban planning with a view to converting it into a sustainable metropolis. The renovation of Ciudad del Este is being planned by architects, civil engineers and Argentine professionals with the goal of upgrading the transportation infrastructure.

Transportation 
Guarani International Airport, located in the suburb city of Minga Guazú, connects the city with other Paraguayan destinations, as well as having international cargo flights to Africa, Asia and North America.

Migration–Diplomatics 
The following consulates or consulate generals for diplomatic services are located in Ciudad del Este:

 Argentina – Consulate General: Boquerón c/Adrián Jara – Edificio China 7º piso
 Brazil – Consulate: Calle Pampliega Nr. 205 Esquina con Pai Perez
 France – Honorary Consulate: Paraná Country Club, Hernandarias, Casilla de correo 309, 7000 Ciudad del Este
  (Germany) – Honorary Consulate: Avenida Paraná 77, Paraná Country Club
 Mexico – Honorary Consulate: Av. Adrian Jara, edif. Banco Unión, 3º piso, Oficina 20
 Peru – Honorary Consulate: Km 4 ½, Monday, B° Bernardino Caballero
 Slovakia – Honorary Consulate: Calle Boquerón 310, Edif. Grupo Monalisa S.A.
 Syria – Honorary Consulate: Avda. 11 de Septiembre 399
 Republic of China – Consulate General: Avda. de Lago s/n Barrio Boquerón CP 131
 Turkey – Honorary Consulate: Av. Monseñor Rodríguez s/n entre Itaybaté y Rubio Ñu, Edificio Mannah 10 Piso A

The city also houses several departments for legal, identification, and migration matters:

 Identifications Department – Located on the street Súper Carretera
 Supreme Court of Justice – The place is also known as the Palace of Justice. Located near the Estadio Antonio Oddone Sarubbi of the Club Atlético 3 de Febrero: Avda. Bernardino Caballero e/ Cerro León
 Interpol – The city has a regional office of Interpol.
 National Direction of Migration – Located at the head of the Friendship Bridge bordering Brazil: Cabecera del Puente de la Amistad, margen derecho (Ruta Internacional Nº 7 – Dr. José Gaspar Rodriguez de Francia)

Notable people 
 Axel Bachmann: Chess player, two-time Ibero-American chess champion (2013–2014).
 Braian Samudio: Professional footballer.
Fabián Balbuena: Professional footballer.

Distances from Ciudad del Este

Twin towns – sister cities
Puerto Iguazú, Argentina

Gallery

References

External links 

 
  Municipal website of Ciudad del Este (in Spanish)
 Ciudad del Este
  CiudaddelEste.com.py

 
Ciudad del Este District
Populated places established in 1957
1957 establishments in Paraguay
Argentina–Paraguay border
Brazil–Paraguay border crossings